Tabenkin is a Jewish surname.

Yitzhak Tabenkin (1888-1971) Zionist activist and Israeli politician
Joseph Tabenkin (1921-1987), Israeli military commander
 (1914-1988), Soviet artist

See also
Yitav

Jewish surnames